is a rural district located just east of Nagoya in central eastern Aichi Prefecture, Japan.

As of 1 October 2019, the district had an estimated population of 44,109 and a population density of 2,446 persons per km2. Its total area was 18.03 km2.

Towns and villages
There is currently only one town in the district:
Tōgō

History
Aichi District was one of the ancient subdivisions of Owari Province, and its name (under a variety of spellings) appears in Nara period records and artifacts recovered from the ruins of Heijō-kyō Palace. During the Sengoku period, this area was the stronghold of the Oda clan and was the birthplace of Toyotomi Hideyoshi. After the establishment of the Tokugawa Shogunate, it came under the control of Owari Domain.

Following the Meiji Restoration, in 1871, former Owari Domain was renamed Nagoya Prefecture. However, for reasons still unclear, the name was changed to Aichi Prefecture. With the formal establishment of the municipality system on October 1, 1887, the modern Aichi District was established, with two towns (Atsuta and Narumi) and 46 villages. Yobitsugi was raised to town status on July 12, 1897, followed by Chikusa on February 13, 1902, and Aichi on December 10, 1904. In a major cadastral reorganization in 1906–1907, the number of remaining villages was reduced from 41 to 16, and the town of Atsuta was annexed by the city of Nagoya. The town of Shimonoisshiki was created on July 6, 1917. In another cadastral reform in 1921, the number of villages was reduced from 16 to 7, with the towns of Aichi and Yobitsugi annexed by Nagoya. The city of Nagoya further annexed Shimonoisshiki in March 1937, leaving the district with one town and 7 villages at the eve of World War II.

On February 11, 1955, the village of Hanyama merged into the city of Seto. Later that year, on April 5, 1955, the village of Chotaka merged into Chikusa-ku, Nagoya. The village of Tempaku (later Tempaku-ku) merged into Showa-ku, Nagoya. On January 1, 1957 Toyoake gained town status, following by Nisshin on January 1, 1958. On April 1, 1963 Narumi merged into Midori-ku, Nagoya.

Tōgō gained town status on April 1, 1970, followed by Nagakute on April 1, 1971. Toyoake was elevated to city status on August 1, 1972, followed by Nisshin on October 1, 1994. On January 4, 2012 – The town of Nagakute gained city status.

This left Aichi District with one municipality.

References

External links
Counties of Japan

Districts in Aichi Prefecture